Roberto Blanco (born 1937) is a German singer and actor.

Roberto Blanco may also refer to:

 Roberto Blanco (actor) (1903–1965), Argentine stage and film actor
 Roberto Blanco (footballer) (born 1938), Argentine footballer